John William Bristol (February 3, 1939 – March 21, 2004) was an American musician, most famous as a songwriter and record producer for the Motown label in the late 1960s and early 1970s. He was a native of Morganton, North Carolina, about which he wrote an eponymous song. His composition "Love Me for a Reason" saw global success when covered by The Osmonds including a number 1 in the UK charts in 1974. His most famous solo recording was "Hang On in There Baby" recorded in 1974, which reached the Top Ten in the United States and number 3 in the United Kingdom. Both singles were in the UK top 5 simultaneously.

Motown producer
Bristol first came to local attention in the Detroit area as a member of the soul duo 'Johnny & Jackey' with Jackey Beavers, an associate Bristol met while in the US Air Force. The pair recorded two singles in 1959 for Anna Records, a label owned by Gwen Gordy (Berry Gordy's sister) and Billy Davis and four 45s for Gwen Gordy and Harvey Fuqua's Tri-Phi label, none of which was a success beyond the Midwestern United States.

In the mid 1960s, Motown had absorbed Tri-Phi and Bristol began working with Fuqua as a songwriter and producer. Amongst their successes as producers were hit singles: Marvin Gaye and Tammi Terrell's "Ain't No Mountain High Enough" (1967), "Your Precious Love" (1967), and "If I Could Build My Whole World Around You" (1968); Edwin Starr's "Twenty-Five Miles" (1969); and David Ruffin's "My Whole World Ended (The Moment You Left Me)" (1969).

Bristol flourished at Motown working with some of the label's best-selling acts. His producer and/or writer credits included: The Velvelettes' "These Things Will Keep Me Loving You" (1966); Gladys Knight & the Pips' "I Don't Want to Do Wrong" (1971) and "Daddy Could Swear, I Declare" (1973); and Jr. Walker & the All Stars, who charted with a number of Bristol-written singles and albums, including "What Does It Take (To Win Your Love)" (1969), "Gotta Hold On to This Feeling" (1970), "Way Back Home" (1971) and "Walk in the Night" (1971). One of his last successes was Jermaine Jackson's first solo record, "That's How Love Goes" (1972).

Notably, Bristol was the producer and co-writer of the final singles for both Diana Ross & the Supremes and Smokey Robinson & the Miracles, before each group lost its namesake lead singer. While the Miracles' "We've Come Too Far to End It Now" (1972) was an original, the Supremes' "Someday We'll Be Together" (1969) was a remake of a Johnny & Jackey single from 1961. Bristol is the male voice on the Supremes' version of "Someday We'll Be Together", singing response to Diana Ross' lead vocal. (Ross actually recorded the song as her initial solo release with session singers The Waters Sisters.)

Producer and solo performer
Bristol left Motown in 1973 to join CBS as a producer. He worked with a number of emerging singers that included Randy Crawford, for whom Bristol wrote Caught in Love's Triangle, as well as producing and writing for established performers such as: Tom Jones, Marlena Shaw, Johnny Mathis, Jerry Butler and Boz Scaggs. In 1974 he wrote and produced La La Peace Song recorded by both Al Wilson and O.C.Smith. Bristol's vocals are featured on the Al Wilson version.

Now in his early 30s, he was anxious to resume his own recording career, and when CBS/Columbia showed little enthusiasm he signed a recording contract with MGM. At MGM, Bristol recorded two successful albums Hang On in There Baby and Feeling the Magic and charted with several singles, notably "Hang On in There Baby" (1974, number 8 US Pop, number 2 US R&B chart and number 3 UK), "You and I" (1974, number 20 US R&B), "Leave My World" (1975, number 23 US R&B) and "Do It to My Mind" (1976, number 5 US R&B). He also recorded the original version of "Love Me for a Reason", later a major hit for The Osmonds. He was nominated for a Grammy Award in 1975 for Best New Artist, ultimately losing out to Marvin Hamlisch.

Bristol then recorded two albums for Atlantic, Bristol's Creme (1976) and Strangers (1978). One track from the Atlantic period, "Strangers In The Dark Corners", has become popular on the European rare-soul scene. He maintained a parallel role as a producer during this period, working mainly for artists signed to Columbia Records, including Boz Scaggs. Bristol can be credited with creating Scaggs' blue-eyed soul sound for the Slow Dancer album (1974). Bristol also produced Tom Jones' 1975 album, Memories Don't Leave Like People Do, which included five covers of Bristol's songs, including the title track. He continued to be held in high regard as a producer, and some of the other acts with whom he worked included: Tavares, Margie Joseph, The Jackson Sisters and two duets with Linda Evans, Sweet and Deep and Share with Me My Dream on his 1981 album Free to Be Me. 

Bristol's main market was in Europe by the early 1980s. His duet with Amii Stewart on a medley of "My Guy - My Girl" reached number 39 in the UK Singles Chart in 1980. A deal for Ariola/Hansa saw him score with club hits Love No Longer Has a Hold on Me and Take Me Down. An accompanying album failed to consolidate his status, and it would be eight years before new product by Bristol appeared, with a 12" single I'm Just a Musician for Hansa. An affiliation in 1989 with the UK record label Motorcity Records was brief, but did result in one of Bristol's most popular releases, Man Up in the Sky, and a cover of the Bristol-penned What Does It Take to Win Your Love, originally a hit for Jr. Walker & the All Stars.

Bristol's last releases were a 12" single in 1991 for Whichway Records, Come to Me, and an album, Life & Love, released for the Japanese market in 1993 by Blues Interactions (P-Vine Records). The latter included Earth, Wind & Fire's That's the Way of the World as a duet with his daughter, Shanna J. Bristol. The album received a US release three years later under the title Come To Me.

Bristol died in his Brighton Township, Michigan, home on 21 March 2004, of natural causes, at the age of 65.

A comprehensive article on his career is contained in issue 51 of the music magazine, In the Basement.

Bristol was inducted into the North Carolina Music Hall of Fame in 2009.

Personal 
Bristol was married twice. First was to Maude Perry. They had two children. His second marriage was to Iris Gordy. They had one child, Karla Gordy Bristol.

Discography

Albums

Compilation albums
 Best of Johnny Bristol (Polydor, 1978)
 The MGM Years (Hip-O Select, 2004)

Singles

See also
List of 1970s one-hit wonders in the United States
List of disco artists (F-K)
List of performers on Top of the Pops

References

External links

"An Interview with Motown Great Johnny Bristol"

1939 births
2004 deaths
African-American record producers
African-American male singer-songwriters
Singer-songwriters from North Carolina
Singer-songwriters from Michigan
MGM Records artists
Motown artists
People from Morganton, North Carolina
Record producers from Michigan
Record producers from North Carolina
20th-century African-American male singers